Theo Alice Ruggles Kitson (January 29, 1871 – October 29, 1932), also known as Tho. A. R. Kitson and Theo Alice Ruggles, was an American sculptor.

Life 

Kitson was born in Brookline, Massachusetts, to Cyrus W. and Anna H. Ruggles. As a young child she displayed artistic talent, but when her mother attempted to enroll her in the School of the Museum of Fine Arts, Boston, she was informed that she was too young to be admitted. Her mother then approached other schools, which gave her the same advice. One of the school directors, however, suggested that she find a tutor for her and pointed her in the direction of a rising star, Henry Hudson Kitson.

She began studying with sculptor Henry Hudson Kitson in 1886, and married him in Boston in 1893 in the social event of the season. They had three children together, sons Theo and John and daughter Dorothy.

In 1888, she won honorable mention at the Salon des Artistes Francais, becoming the youngest woman, and the first American woman, ever to receive the honor. She was lionized when she returned to the United States for this award and was asked to comment on everything from the state of American art to men's fashions. In 1895 she was the first woman to be admitted to the National Sculpture Society.

In the early 1900s, she designed seventy-three sculptures now located at various sites within Vicksburg National Military Park. Predominantly busts and portrait reliefs honoring the general officers from both sides that fought there, Kitson is the most prolific of the artists represented there. The Massachusetts state monument, dedicated on November 14, 1903, was the first state monument to be placed and dedicated in the park.

After the Kitsons separated in 1909, she moved to Farmington, where she maintained a studio until her 1932 death in Boston, Massachusetts. Her work is featured on the Boston Women's Heritage Trail.

In the course of her career she created many public monuments, both in conjunction with her husband and on her own.  Her best known statue is The Hiker, a monument commemorating the soldiers who fought in the wars of the United States' turn of the 20th Century Manifest Destiny territorial expansion, the Spanish–American War, the Philippine–American War and the Boxer Rebellion.  Around 50 versions of this work can be discovered spread over much of the United States.

World's Fairs 
Kitson exhibited at the 1893 World's Columbian Exposition. She was one of four female painters or sculptors who exhibited more than three works of art, including: A New England Fisherman (1892); On the Banks of the Oise (1889); Portrait Bust of an Italian Child (ca. 1887); and Young Orpheus (ca. 1890).

Additionally, she won a bronze medal at the 1904 St. Louis World's Fair.

Selected works 
 The Hiker
 The Volunteer soldier monument. Dedicated in Newburyport, Massachusetts, July 4, 1902. Reproductions in North Providence, Rhode Island, 1904; Walden, New York, 1904; Sharon, Massachusetts, 1908.
 Statue of Tadeusz Kościuszko, Boston Public Garden
 Mother Bickerdyke Memorial, Galesburg, Illinois
 Sherman Monument, Washington, D.C. She sculpted the medallions depicting corps commanders who served under Sherman in the U.S. Civil War.
 Monument to the 124th New York Volunteer Infantry Regiment, Goshen, New York
 Esek Hopkins Memorial, Providence, 1891

Relief portraits at Vicksburg National Military Park

Notes

References 

 Opitz, Glenn B, Editor, Mantle Fielding's Dictionary of American Painters, Sculptors & Engravers, Apollo Book, Poughkeepsie NY, 1986.
 Rubenstein, Charlotte Streifer, American Women Sculptors, G.K. Hall & Co., Boston, 1990.

1871 births
1932 deaths
People from Brookline, Massachusetts
American women sculptors
Sculptors from Massachusetts
20th-century American sculptors
20th-century American women artists
National Sculpture Society members